Gustave-Auguste Besson (1820-1874) was a musical instrument manufacturer and innovator. He created the Besson brand in Paris, France, in 1837. Besson is credited with more than 50 original inventions. His alterations to the cornet were particularly notable. 

Besson's instruments were revolutionary in their design and quality, and as such became famous across Europe. After a series of lawsuits with Adolphe Sax, Besson left Paris in 1858 and relocated to London. He continued to manufacture instruments in Paris and London and had distribution warehouses in Brussels, Charleroi, Madrid and Barcelona. After Besson's death in 1874, the company changed its name in France to become Fontaine-Besson in 1880. It remained Besson in Great Britain.

References

1820 births
1874 deaths
Businesspeople from Paris
French musical instrument makers